The Super League is the top tier rugby league competition for teams in Europe. It was formed in 1996 replacing the Rugby League Championship which was the top tier in Britain from 1895 to 1996 .

Since 1998, the winner of the Super League has been determined by a play-off series at the end of each season, culminating in a Grand Final at the Old Trafford stadium. Four teams have won the Grand Final during the history of the Super League, with St Helens being the current holders. St Helens are the most successful team in the Super League era, with ten titles. In the first two seasons of Super League, the champion was determined by league position at the end of the season.

The participants of the play-off series are determined by the league position of teams at the end of the regular season. The team at the top the Super League table at the end of the regular season are awarded with the League Leaders Shield. St Helens are the current holders of the League Leaders Shield, and hold the record for most Shields with nine. The League Leaders have been recognised at the end of the regular season since the introduction of the play-offs in 1998, however the Shield awarded to teams was only introduced in 2003.

Seasons (1996 - Present)

Team Performances

Season Overview 

 a: Champions decided by league table
 b: Elected in/out of league without promotion/relegation via league performance

Grand Finals 

a: No crowd due to COVID-19 restrictions

Individual Performances

Top Scorers

Man of Steel 

The Man of Steel Award is given to the Super League Player of the Season. Various methods of determining the seasons best player have been employed throughout the awards history. The current method involves points being designated to players by a select panel following each fixture. The award is also known as the Steve Prescott Man of Steel, posthumously named after the former St Helens player who established the Steve Prescott Foundation to raise money for cancer research whilst fighting his own battle with cancer, which he tragically lost in 2013.

Harry Sunderland Trophy Winner 

The Harry Sunderland Trophy is awarded to the Man of the Match of the Super League Grand Final. The award predates Super League and was previously awarded to the Man of the Match of the Rugby League Premiership Final.

† = denotes a player who won the trophy but played on the losing team in the final.

a: Award won in Premiership Final inside Super League Era.

League Structure 
Throughout the history of Super League, the competition has been structured in various formats effecting awarding of championships, participation in play-off series, and inclusion in the league itself.

a: Catalans Dragons exempt for relegation for first two seasons in Super League.
 b : Teams reduced to 11 following exit of Toronto Wolfpack midseason. Toronto were later prevented from readmission with relegation cancelled for 2020.
c: Play-off structure amended to mitigate against COVID-19 implications.

See also

Super League
Super League Grand Final
Man of Steel
Harry Sunderland Trophy
RFL Championship (1895-1996)
List of British Rugby League Champions

References

External links

Seasons
Rugby league-related lists